Hiwot Gebrekidan (born 11 May 1995) is an Ethiopian long-distance runner.

In 2012, she won the silver medal in the women's 3000 metres event at the World Junior Championships in Athletics held in Barcelona, Spain.

She won the women's race at the 2017 Tiberias Marathon held in Israel. In 2019, she won women's race at the Guangzhou Marathon held in Guangzhou, China. She also set a new course record of 2:23:50.

In April 2021, she won the Milano City Marathon held in Milan, Italy. In September 2021, she finished in 2nd place in the women's race at the Berlin Marathon in Berlin, Germany.

References

External links
 

Living people
1995 births
Place of birth missing (living people)
Ethiopian female long-distance runners
Ethiopian female marathon runners
21st-century Ethiopian women